Erastus Wentworth (Pinyin: Wànwéi; Foochow Romanized: Uâng-ùi; August 5, 1813 – May 26, 1886) was an educator, a Methodist Episcopal minister, and a missionary to Fuzhou, China.

Life 
Dr. Wentworth was born in Stonington, Connecticut. He converted to Methodism in 1831. Later he studied at the Cazenovia Seminary and earned a bachelor's degree at Wesleyan University in 1837.

Wentworth began teaching after leaving college. From 1838 to 1846, he taught natural science in the Gouverneur Wesleyan Seminary; from 1841 to 1846, in the Troy Conference Academy; and in 1846, he became president of the McKendree College, remaining there until 1850, when he took the chair of natural philosophy and chemistry in Dickinson College. In 1850, he received the degree of D.D. from Allegheny College.

In 1854, Dr. Wentworth left his position to spearhead a Methodist Mission to Fuzhou, China, along with some students who were just graduating from Dickinson, including Otis T. Gibson. In 1862, his wife's poor health forced him to return to the United States, where he then worked as a pastor to the Troy Conference Academy.

Wentworth edited the Ladies' Repository from 1872–76, after which he semi-retired, writing and serving on committees for the Methodist Church. On May 26, 1886, he died at his home in  Sandy Hill, New York, aged 73.

Family
The son of Erastus and Esther (States) Wentworth, and seventh generation descendant of William Wentworth (elder), Erastus married three times, was widowed twice, and had twelve children, one in China.

References 

American Methodist missionaries
Methodist missionaries in China
Christian missionaries in Fujian
Cazenovia College alumni
Methodist writers
Wesleyan University alumni
Allegheny College alumni
1813 births
1886 deaths
American expatriates in China